Stephen McPhee (born 5 June 1981) is a Scottish former footballer. In a ten-year career he played for clubs in the Netherlands, Scotland, England and Portugal. He was capped for his country at under-21 level. A forward, he scored 56 goals in 252 games in all competitions.

Starting his career at Coventry City, following a loan to St Mirren in 2001, he signed with Port Vale later in the year. He made his name at Vale, playing the majority of his career appearances in a three-year spell at the club. Leaving the club for Beira-Mar of Portugal, in 2005 he made a big money move to Hull City. Two years later he moved on to Blackpool. He retired in 2010 after being dogged with injury problems since his time in Portugal.

Club career

Early career
Born in Glasgow, McPhee began his career with his brother Gary at Vitesse Arnhem in the Netherlands. In 1998, he went to England at Coventry City, but did not make a senior appearance for the "Sky Blues", who were then in the Premier League. In 2001 Coventry sent him on loan to Scottish Premier League club St Mirren, who had hoped to sign Ronaldinho, but instead settled for the young hopeful McPhee. He played seven games for the "Saints" and won the April 2001 SPL Young Player of the Month Award.

Port Vale
McPhee signed for Port Vale on a free transfer in July 2001 and would soon show himself to be arguably Brian Horton's best signing at the club. He scored on his debut against Notts County and finished the season as the club's top scorer with 14 goals in 51 games, including one in the 2001 Potteries derby. Paul Jewell's Wigan Athletic made a bid for McPhee that was accepted by his club (£300,000), however the deal fell through as the Scotsman's agent rejected Wigan's contract offer. The 2002–03 season was one largely devoid of goals for the striker, his strike against Oldham Athletic in October ended a run of 21 games without a goal, but only two goals followed in the remaining 34 matches.

In the 2003–04 season he scored 27 goals to help Vale finish seventh in League One, this was the second highest goal tally for a Port Vale player in 66 years. For this feat he was named player of the year at Vale Park, but as the team had not secured promotion McPhee rejected a new contract. A British club would have to negotiate a fee with the "Valiants" before talking to McPhee, however a foreign club would be free to sign him without dealing with Vale.

Rumours linking McPhee with Portuguese side Beira-Mar were denied by the club and chairman Bill Bratt stated "this is news to us". The following week the cash-strapped club rejected a £100,000 bid from Leeds United "out of hand", branding it as an offer "not even worth considering".

Beira-Mar
Later that month his agent negotiated a move to Beira-Mar meaning Vale lost the player for nothing. McPhee said the move not about money, but about "bettering himself".

Beira-Mar were managed at the time by Mick Wadsworth, who was sacked four games after McPhee signed. McPhee was used in various positions and scored five goals in 31 appearances, but despite this Beira-Mar were relegated from the Portuguese top flight in bottom place. Despite the club's poor season his consistent performances attracted interest from other clubs.

Hull City
McPhee joined Hull City on 19 May 2005 for a fee widely reported to be £220,000. However, the club website stated, "The Scottish striker joined the Championship-bound Tigers in a new club record deal with the McPhee fee reported in excess of £400,000 when Stephen was signed from Beira Mar in May 2005."

He suffered a knee injury in only his fourth league appearance for City, and missed the rest of the 2005–06 season and the start of the 2006–07 season. He eventually returned to action in December 2006 away at Plymouth Argyle, which was also manager Phil Brown's first match in charge of the club. He ended up missing most of the rest of the season again through injury.

Blackpool
On 7 January 2008, McPhee moved to Blackpool for an undisclosed fee, penning a two-and-a-half-year contract. The fee was £215,000, with the potential to rise to £300,000, depending on appearances. The next month McPhee was named in the Championship's "Team of the Week", alongside teammate Kaspars Gorkšs. On 4 April 2009, he played his last professional game, replacing Keith Southern 61 minutes into a 1–0 defeat by Plymouth Argyle at Bloomfield Road.

On 26 May 2010, less than a week after Blackpool were promoted to the Premier League, McPhee announced his retirement from football. He had struggled for the previous 18 months with a knee injury, which kept him sidelined for the whole of the previous season.

International career
McPhee won his first Scotland under-21 cap in October 2001 against Latvia under-21s.

Style of play
McPhee was an energetic and tenacious forward.

Coaching career
In July 2010, Blackpool manager Ian Holloway offered McPhee a coaching role at the club, an offer that the Scot accepted. He left his post thirteen months later, citing dissatisfaction at his wage level. In 2012, he returned to another former club, Port Vale, as a youth team coach.

Personal life
McPhee struggled with depression as his career was gradually brought to a premature end due to his injury problems; he attempted suicide . He recovered, and opened his own printing business 'Minuteman Press Cheadle' in 2013.

Career statistics

Honours
Individual
SPL Young Player of the Month Award: April 2001
Port Vale F.C. Player of the Year: 2004
Championship team of the week member: 25 February 2008
Championship play-off final winner: 2009–10

References

External links

1981 births
Living people
Footballers from Glasgow
Scottish footballers
Scotland under-21 international footballers
Association football forwards
SBV Vitesse players
Coventry City F.C. players
St Mirren F.C. players
Port Vale F.C. players
Scottish expatriate footballers
Expatriate footballers in Portugal
Scottish expatriate sportspeople in Portugal
S.C. Beira-Mar players
Hull City A.F.C. players
Blackpool F.C. players
Blackpool F.C. non-playing staff
Scottish Premier League players
Primeira Liga players
English Football League players
Association football coaches
Port Vale F.C. non-playing staff
Expatriate footballers in the Netherlands
Scottish expatriate sportspeople in the Netherlands